Allan Steven Wlk Duré (born 1 March 2003) is a Paraguayan footballer who plays as a striker for Club Olimpia and the Paraguay national under-20 football team.

Club career

Olimpia
Wlk played at Club Nacional as a child but started playing for Club Olimpia from the age of 14 years-old. He broke numerous goal scoring records as a teenager including one period where he scored 130 goals in 3 seasons of youth football. He signed a professional contract with Olimpia in 2021 lasting until 2025.

International career

South America Games: Gold medal and top scorer
Wlk was the tournament top scorer as Paraguay won gold at the 2022 South American Games held in Paraguay between 4 and 12 October, 2022. His haul at the games of six goals in five games included a hat-trick against Peru. He also scored the only goal in the final as Paraguay beat Ecuador 1-0. Wlk was quoted as saying after the final; “This achievement is something unique that I will never forget, at the time I could not measure what we had achieved. I am very proud of this great group because we gave everything and we were fair winners of this gold medal”.

South American U20 Championships
Wlk was named in the Paraguay squad for the 2023 South American U-20 Championship held in Colombia which commenced in January 2023. He scored in Paraguay’s first two games, first against Colombia in a 1-1 draw, and second in a 2-1 win over Argentina.

Personal life
His father is called Cristhian Wlk.
Regarding his surname Wlk was quoted as saying to the radio station Universo 970AM "My great-grandfather came from the Czech Republic after the war, he arrived and settled in Colonia Independencia, I often visit the place."

References

External links

2003 births
Living people
Paraguayan footballers
Paraguay youth international footballers
Paraguayan people of Czech descent
Association football forwards
Club Olimpia footballers